Paul Hamblin is a British sound engineer. He was nominated for an Academy Award in the category Best Sound Mixing for the film The King's Speech. He has worked on over 120 films since 1983.

Selected filmography
 The King's Speech (2010)

References

External links

Year of birth missing (living people)
Living people
British audio engineers